Felix Flores (born January 29, 1976 in Juana Díaz, Puerto Rico) is a professional boxer.

Flores, who fights out of Puerto Rico, has been featured numerous times on Telemundo. In February 2005, Flores got his first loss on March 30, 1996 vs. Juan Carlos Suarez (7-0-1) in Miami Beach losing by Knockout in the 3rd round.

His record is 22-7 with 16 KOs in 29 bouts.

See also 

 

1976 births
Living people
People from Juana Díaz, Puerto Rico
Puerto Rican male boxers
Light-welterweight boxers